The United Nations Office of Legal Affairs is a United Nations office currently administered by Under-Secretary-General for Legal Affairs and Legal Counsel of the United Nations Miguel de Serpa Soares.

History 
Established in 1946, the United Nations Office of Legal Affairs provides a unified central legal service for the Secretariat and the principal and other organs of the United Nations and contributes to the progressive development and codification of international public and trade law. Pursuant to Article 102 of the UN Charter, OLA registers, publishes, and serves as a depository of international treaties. The office also functions to promote the strengthening and development as well as the effective implementation of the international legal order for the seas and oceans.

Units 
The Office consists of six divisions:
 Office of the Legal Counsel (OLC)
 General Legal Division (GLD)
 Codification Division (COD)
 Division for Ocean Affairs and the Law of the Sea (DOALOS)
 International Trade Law Division (ITLD)
 Treaty Section (TREATY).

Treaties 
The Office of Legal Affairs, through its Treaty Section, discharges the depositary functions of the Secretary-General under more than 560 multilateral treaties, including the custody of originals and the receipt of signatures and instruments of ratification, accession, etc. The Office is also responsible for the registration and publication of treaties and international agreements under Article 102 of the Charter of the United Nations.

After their adoption, Treaties as well as their amendments have to follow the official legal procedures of the United Nations, as applied by the Office of Legal Affairs, including signature, ratification and entry into force.

See also
 United Nations General Assembly Sixth Committee (Legal)
 International conventions on terrorism
 International Law Commission
 United Nations Commission on International Trade Law

References 
 Hans Corell: United Nations Office of Legal Affairs, in: Karel Wellens (ed.): International Law: Theory and Practice. Essays in Honour of Eric Suy, The Hague/Boston/London: Martinus Nijhoff 1998, pp. 305–322.

External links 
 UN Office of Legal Affairs (OLA)
 International Law - Action Plan
 Treaty Section (OLA)
 United Nations Rule of Law: The Office of Legal Affairs, on the rule of law work conducted by the Office of Legal Affairs.
 The United Nations Audiovisual Library of International Law

Organizations established by the United Nations
United Nations Secretariat
International law organizations